National Institute of Biotechnology (NIB)() is a governmental institute in Bangladesh under the Ministry of Science and Technology.

History 
It was established in 2010 by the government as part of an ADP(Annual Development Project) project (started in 1999) to intensify the biotechnological research in the country. Dr. Naiyyum Choudhury was the founding project director of the Institute The main objective of the institute is to coordinate the biotechnological researches carried out throughout the country as well as conducting its own research programs in different areas of biotechnology. The institute is also responsible to create skilled manpower for biotechnology and genetic engineering.</ref>

Started from 2009 National Institute of Biotechnology started many job opportunities with help of NIB Job Circular porta. Many candidates already working with this government institute.

References 

Research institutes in Bangladesh
Biotechnology
1999 establishments in Bangladesh
Agriculture in Bangladesh